Třešňák is a Czech surname. Notable people with the surname include:

 Karel Třešňák (born 1949), Czechoslovak slalom canoer
 Vlastimil Třešňák (born 1950), Czech folk singer, songwriter, dissident and author
 Lukáš Třešňák (born 1988), Czech football player

Czech-language surnames